Robert Tolley (14 March 1849 – 2 January 1901) was an English first-class cricketer active 1871–78 who played for Nottinghamshire. He was born in Radford, Nottinghamshire; died in Nottingham.

References

1849 births
1901 deaths
English cricketers
Nottinghamshire cricketers
North v South cricketers